Liberty Township is one of twelve townships in White County, Indiana, United States. As of the 2010 census, its population was 2,223 and it contained 2,082 housing units.

Liberty Township was established in 1838.

Geography

Cities, towns, villages
 Buffalo

Unincorporated towns
 Sitka at 
(This list is based on USGS data and may include former settlements.)

Adjacent townships
 Beaver Township, Pulaski County (north)
 Indian Creek Township, Pulaski County (northeast)
 Cass Township (east)
 Lincoln Township (southeast)
 Union Township (south)
 Monon Township (west)

Cemeteries
The township contains these three cemeteries: Clark, Hughes and Warden.

Landmarks
 Cp Buffalo

School districts
 North White School Corporation
 Twin Lakes School Corporation

Political districts
 Indiana's 2nd congressional district
 State House District 15
 State House District 16
 State Senate District 07

References
 United States Census Bureau 2007 TIGER/Line Shapefiles
 United States Board on Geographic Names (GNIS)
 IndianaMap

External links
 Indiana Township Association
 United Township Association of Indiana

Townships in White County, Indiana
Townships in Indiana
1838 establishments in Indiana
Populated places established in 1838